Established in 2001 as a tertiary care hospital, it has since become the market leader among private hospital chains in Western India. Sterling Addlife India Pvt. Ltd. owns and manages the hospital, which adheres to a patient-centric approach, ethical medical practices, and world-class healthcare as its corporate philosophy. Sterling offers a range of high-quality medical and surgical care in several critical specialties across its four multi-specialty hospitals located in Gujarat, namely Ahmedabad (298 beds), Vadodara (192 beds), Rajkot (190 beds), and Gandhidham (135 beds)

Achievement 
In 2009, Sterling became the first hospital in Gujarat to be fully accredited by NABH. Its laboratories were also the first in Gujarat to be accredited by NABL.

In 2010, for the second consecutive year, Sterling Hospital had been named the "No. 1" hospital in Ahmedabad based on the latest THE WEEK – IMRB surveys.

In 2014, Sterling claimed that it was the first hospital chain in Gujarat to have a comprehensive diagnostics mobile application. Sterling Accuris Diagnosics is a sister concern of Sterling Group with 50+ labs across India.

In 2017, Sterling Cancer Hospitals was launched to provide dedicated healthcare services for cancer patients. This hospitals are located in Ahmedabad, Baroda and Gandhidham

References

External links 
Official Website
Sterling Hospital Ahmedabad Updated News & Details

Hospital networks in India
Hospitals in Ahmedabad
2001 establishments in Gujarat
Indian companies established in 2001